Ozyorsky District is an administrative district (raion), one of the fifteen in Kaliningrad Oblast, Russia. It is located in the southeast of the oblast. Its administrative center is the town of Ozyorsk. Population:  17,239 (2002 Census);  The population of Ozyorsk accounts for 30.9% of the district's total population.

Geography
The district is situated in the southeast of the oblast, at the border with Poland. It is sparsely populated. The Angrapa River flows through the district. Forests and steppe pasture-land prevail.

Administrative and municipal status
Within the framework of administrative divisions, Ozyorsky District is one of the fifteen in the oblast. The town of Ozyorsk serves as its administrative center.

As a municipal division, the district has been incorporated as Ozyorsky Urban Okrug since June 11, 2014. Prior to that date, the district was incorporated as Ozyorsky Municipal District, which was subdivided into one urban settlement and three rural settlements.

Economy
District economy is agrarian. No major roads or railways pass through the district; bus lines carry most of the public transit.

References

Notes

Sources

Districts of Kaliningrad Oblast